Wayne Sobers (born 16 August 1969) is a Barbadian international footballer who plays for Notre Dame, as a defender.

Career
Sobers played for the Barbadian national team between 1992 and 2005, which included nine FIFA World Cup qualifying matches.

References

1969 births
Living people
Barbadian footballers
Barbados international footballers
Notre Dame SC players
Association football defenders